Jutila is a Finnish surname. Notable people with the surname include:

Matti Jutila (born 1932), Finnish-born Canadian wrestler
Matti Jutila (born 1943), Finnish mathematician and professor at the University of Turku
Timo Jutila (born 1963), Finnish ice hockey defenceman

Finnish-language surnames
Surnames of Finnish origin